The 1920 International cricket season was from April 1920 to August 1920. The season consists with English domestic season.

Season overview

July

Ireland in Scotland

References

1920 in cricket